Valentin Dimitrov Yordanov (born January 26, 1960), also transliterated Jordanov, is a retired Bulgarian freestyle wrestler who competed in the up to 52 kg weight class. He is an Olympic gold medalist, seven-time world champion, seven-time European champion, and the only wrestler to hold 10 medals (seven gold, two silver and one bronze) from world championships.

Early life
He was born in the Bulgarian village of Sandrovo in the Ruse Municipality. He began wrestling at the age of 10, and was coached by Georgi Achev from 1970 to 1978. He did his military service at the sports school of the CSKA Sofia sports club from 1978 to 1980, where he worked with Yancho Patrikov. He won his first European championship in 1980 in Bursa, Turkey, and his first world championship in 1983 in Kyiv. He continued to work at the CSKA sports club until 1990. He was one of two people to be named the Bulgarian Sportsperson of the Year in 1989.

Team Foxcatcher
In 1990, Yordanov emigrated to the United States, training and living at multi-millionaire John du Pont's Foxcatcher Farm in Pennsylvania while continuing to wrestle for Bulgaria. He won a bronze medal at the 1992 Barcelona Olympics in the Freestyle Flyweight 52 kg event and a gold medal in the same event at the 1996 Atlanta Olympics.

Post-retirement
He retired from wrestling after the 1996 Olympics. In 1997 he became a member of the Athletes' Commission of FILA, and has been the President of the Bulgarian Wrestling Federation since 1998. He has been a member of the board of the Bulgarian Olympic Committee since 2000. He is married and has two children.

In 2010, multimillionaire John du Pont died in prison serving his sentence for murder; du Pont's most recent will had bequeathed 80 percent of his estate to Yordanov,  his wife, Zdravka Moneta Atanosova Dimitrov, and their relatives. Du Pont had been a Forbes 400 member worth an estimated US$200 million in 1986, about $ in current dollars.  The Superior Court of Pennsylvania upheld a Delaware County Orphans Court order dismissing a challenge to the will from du Pont's family.

In 2013, Yordanov returned his 1996 Olympic gold medal in protest of the International Olympic Committee's decision to eliminate wrestling from the Olympics.

References

External links
 
 
 

Sportspeople from Ruse, Bulgaria
Wrestlers at the 1988 Summer Olympics
Wrestlers at the 1992 Summer Olympics
Wrestlers at the 1996 Summer Olympics
Medalists at the 1992 Summer Olympics
Medalists at the 1996 Summer Olympics
Bulgarian male sport wrestlers
Olympic wrestlers of Bulgaria
Olympic gold medalists for Bulgaria
Olympic bronze medalists for Bulgaria
Olympic medalists in wrestling
World Wrestling Championships medalists
Bulgarian emigrants to the United States
20th-century Bulgarian people
21st-century Bulgarian people
1960 births
Living people